is a Japanese manga series written and illustrated by Shun Umezawa. It has been serialized in Kodansha's seinen manga magazine Monthly Afternoon since June 2020.

In 2022, The Darwin Incident won the 15th Manga Taishō, as well as the Excellence Award at the 25th Japan Media Arts Festival.

Plot
During a commando operation carried out by an animal rights organization in a biological research institute, a pregnant chimpanzee is discovered, which will give birth to a "humanzee", a half-human, half-chimpanzee being. Named Charlie, he  is raised by human parents for fifteen years. Neither human nor animal, his behavior and his sensitivity will create sparks within the community. But Charlie is unaware that elsewhere, a group of vegan activists seek to make  of him their emblem.

When Charlie entered high school, he met Lucy, a girl who was ridiculed as a "nerd" but was a bright girl, and developed friendship with him. However, the ALA (Animal Liberation Alliance), which "repeatedly engages in terrorist activities in search of animal liberation", adds Charlie to its comrades and "plans to lure him into terrorism", taking extreme measures. It causes the townspeople to change their attitude towards Charlie and his family.

Publication
Kodansha has collected its chapters into individual tankōbon volumes. The first volume was released on November 20, 2020. As of April 21, 2022, four volumes have been released.

During their panel at Anime NYC, Kodansha USA announced that they licensed the manga for a Fall 2023 release.

Volume list

Reception
The Darwin Incident ranked 10th on Takarajimasha's Kono Manga ga Sugoi! 2022 list of best manga for male readers. The series won the 15th Manga Taishō in 2022. The series ranked 2nd on the Publisher Comics' Recommended Comics of 2022. It won an Excellence Award at the 25th Japan Media Arts Festival in 2022.

References

Further reading

External links
  
 

Comics about mammals
Eco-terrorism in fiction
Kodansha manga
Manga Taishō
Science fiction anime and manga
Seinen manga
Thriller anime and manga